Omar Daf (born 12 February 1977) is a Senegalese football manager and former player who is the currently head coach French Ligue 2 club Dijon. A Senegal international, he represented his country at the 2002 FIFA World Cup. He also holds a French passport and spent most of his playing career at French club Sochaux. Daf played as a right-back, but could also play on the left or at centre-back.

Club career
Born in Dakar, Daf began playing football with US Gorée. At age 17, a Belgian football scout, Karel Brokken, recruited him to Belgian Second Division side K.V.C. Westerlo, where he began his professional career. A year later, Daf joined French Championnat National 2 side Thonon-Chablais, before embarking on a 12-year spell with Sochaux in 1997.

Managerial career
In November 2018, Daf became manager of Sochaux. In January 2019, he extended his contract until 2021.

Honours

International
Senegal
Africa Cup of Nations runner-up: 2002

References

External links

1977 births
Living people
Footballers from Dakar
Association football defenders
Senegalese footballers
Senegalese expatriate footballers
Senegal international footballers
2002 FIFA World Cup players
French sportspeople of Senegalese descent
K.V.C. Westerlo players
Expatriate footballers in Belgium
FC Sochaux-Montbéliard players
Stade Brestois 29 players
Ligue 1 players
Ligue 2 players
2000 African Cup of Nations players
2002 African Cup of Nations players
2004 African Cup of Nations players
2006 Africa Cup of Nations players
2012 Africa Cup of Nations players
Senegalese football managers
Senegalese expatriate football managers
FC Sochaux-Montbéliard managers
Senegalese expatriate sportspeople in Belgium
Ligue 2 managers